Placoptila cyclas is a moth in the family Cosmopterigidae. It is found in India.

References

External links
Natural History Museum Lepidoptera generic names catalog

Cosmopteriginae